This is a bibliography of works by Saul Bellow.

Fiction

Novels and novellas

Short stories

Collections

Plays

Non-fiction

Bibliographies by writer
Bibliographies of American writers